Boggudupalli is a small village of about seventy families in the Kadapa District of Andhra Pradesh, India. Its former name was Bokkudupalli.

References

Villages in Kadapa district